The International Online Film Critics' Poll (also known as International Online Film Critics and IOFCP) is a bi-annual polling of film critics from United States, United Kingdom, Italy, Spain, Poland, France, and Canada. The award was created to recognize excellences in film every two years.

The IOFCP was founded in 2007 by George McCoy. The award was created to recognize excellence in film every two years because, in the opinion of the founders, a biennial award allows the comparison of different film seasons. Its membership includes film critics and journalists from Metroactive, Le Nouvel Observateur, Mymovies.it, Cinefilos.it, Las Vegas Weekly, Examiner.com, BBC, The Times, IndieWire, and other periodicals.

The 2010 poll included votes for Best Film of the Decade (Lord of the Rings: The Return of the King), Best Director of the Decade (Peter Jackson for Lord of the Rings: The Return of the King), Best Actor of the Decade (Philip Seymour Hoffman for Capote), Best Actress of the Decade (Charlize Theron for Monster), and Top Ten Films of the Decade.

Categories
The IOFCP features 15 categories. For each category (excepted Top Ten Films), in all editions, there are five nominees. These are the award categories:
Best Picture
Top Ten Films
Best Director
Best Actor
Best Actress
Best Supporting Actor
Best Supporting Actress
Best Ensemble Cast
Best Original Screenplay
Best Adapted Screenplay
Best Cinematography
Best Production Design
Best Editing
Best Original Score
Best Visual Effects

Winners

1st Edition (2008)
1st IOFCP Awards
January 4, 2009

Best Film: 
 Slumdog Millionaire 
The winners of the 1st Edition were revealed on January 4, 2009. The nominees were revealed on December 5, 2008.

Were eligible all the films released in the United States from November 15, 2006, to November 14, 2008. The big winners were Slumdog Millionaire, with four awards, including Best Picture, and The Dark Knight, with four awards.

Best Picture
 Slumdog Millionaire by Danny Boyle
Top Ten Films
 Atonement by Joe Wright
 The Dark Knight by Christopher Nolan
 Into the Wild by Sean Penn
 Let the Right One In by Tomas Alfredson
 Michael Clayton by Tony Gilroy
 No Country for Old Men by Joel and Ethan Coen
 Ratatouille by Brad Bird
 Slumdog Millionaire by Danny Boyle
 There Will Be Blood by Paul Thomas Anderson
 WALL-E by Andrew Stanton
Best Director
 Tomas Alfredson – Let the Right One InBest Actor
 Daniel Day-Lewis – There Will Be BloodBest Actress
 Marion Cotillard – La Vie en roseBest Supporting Actor
 Heath Ledger – The Dark KnightBest Supporting Actress
 Tilda Swinton – Michael ClaytonBest Ensemble Cast
 The Dark KnightBest Original Screenplay
 Pete Docter, Andrew Stanton, and Jim Reardon – WALL-EBest Adapted Screenplay
 Simon Beaufoy – Slumdog MillionaireBest Cinematography
 Anthony Dod Mantle – Slumdog MillionaireBest Production Design
 Sarah Greenwood and Katie Spencer – AtonementBest Editing
 Joel and Ethan Coen – No Country for Old MenBest Original Score
 Alberto Iglesias – The Kite RunnerBest Visual Effects
 Chris Corbould, Nick Davis, Timothy Webber, and Paul J. Franklin – The Dark Knight2nd Edition (2010)
2nd IOFCP Awards
January 9, 2011

Best Film: 
 Inglourious Basterds 
The winners of the 2nd Edition were revealed on January 9, 2011. The nominees were revealed on December 5, 2010.

Were eligible all the films released in the United States from November 15, 2008, to November 15, 2010. The big winners was Quentin Tarantino's Inglourious Basterds, with four awards, including Best Picture and Best Director.

Best Picture
 Inglourious Basterds by Quentin Tarantino
Top Ten Films
 Avatar by James Cameron
 Frost/Nixon by Ron Howard
 Inception by Christopher Nolan
 Inglourious Basterds by Quentin Tarantino
 Milk by Gus Van Sant
 The Hurt Locker by Kathryn Bigelow
 The Social Network by David Fincher
 Up by Bob Peterson and Pete Docter
 Up in the Air by Jason Reitman
 The Wrestler by Darren Aronofsky
Best Director
 Quentin Tarantino – Inglourious BasterdsBest Actor
 Mickey Rourke – The WrestlerBest Actress
 Carey Mulligan – An EducationBest Supporting Actor
 Christoph Waltz – Inglourious BasterdsBest Supporting Actress
 Mo'Nique – Precious: Based on the Novel "Push" by SapphireBest Ensemble Cast
 Up in the AirBest Original Screenplay
 Dustin Lance Black – MilkBest Adapted Screenplay
 Aaron Sorkin – The Social NetworkBest Cinematography
 Wally Pfister – InceptionBest Production Design
 Larry Dias, Doug Mowat, and Guy Hendrix Dyas – InceptionBest Editing
 Chris Innis and Bob Murawski – The Hurt LockerBest Original Score
 Michael Giacchino – UpBest Visual Effects
 Richard Baneham, Joe Letteri, Stephen Rosenbaum, and Andrew R. Jones – Avatar3rd Edition (2012)
3rd IOFCP Awards
December 20, 2012

Best Film: 
 Tinker Tailor Soldier Spy 
The winners of the 3rd Edition were revealed on December 20, 2012. The nominees were revealed on December 1, 2012.

Were eligible all the films released in the United States from November 16, 2010, to November 15, 2012. The big winners were Tinker Tailor Soldier Spy, with seven awards, including Best Picture and Best Director, and The Master, with four awards.

Best Picture
 Tinker Tailor Soldier Spy by Tomas Alfredson
Top Ten Films
 Argo by Ben Affleck
 The Artist by Michel Hazanavicius
 Beasts of the Southern Wild by Benh Zeitlin
 Black Swan by Darren Aronofsky
 The King's Speech by Tom Hooper
 Lincoln by Steven Spielberg
 The Master by Paul Thomas Anderson
 Skyfall by Sam Mendes
 Tinker Tailor Soldier Spy by Tomas Alfredson
 The Tree of Life by Terrence Malick
Best Director
 Tomas Alfredson – Tinker Tailor Soldier SpyBest Actor
 Gary Oldman – Tinker Tailor Soldier SpyBest Actress
 Natalie Portman – Black SwanBest Supporting Actor
 Philip Seymour Hoffman – The MasterBest Supporting Actress
 Amy Adams – The Master 
Best Ensemble Cast
 Tinker Tailor Soldier SpyBest Original Screenplay
 Paul Thomas Anderson – The Master 
Best Adapted Screenplay
 Bridget O'Connor and Peter Straughan – Tinker Tailor Soldier SpyBest Cinematography
 Janusz Kamiński – LincolnBest Production Design
 Maria Djurkovic – Tinker Tailor Soldier Spy 
Best Editing
 Tariq Anwar (film editor) – The King's SpeechBest Original Score
 Ludovic Bource – The Artist 
Best Visual Effects
 Chris Corbould and Paul Franklin – The Dark Knight Rises4th Edition (2014)
4th IOFCP Awards
January 26, 2015

Best Film: 
 Boyhood 
The winners of the 4th Edition were revealed on January 26, 2015.

Best Picture
 Boyhood by Richard Linklater

Top Ten Films12 Years a Slave by Steve McQueenBlue is the Warmest Colour by Abdellatif KechicheBirdman by Alejandro González IñárrituBoyhood by Richard LinklaterHer by Spike JonzeIda by Paweł PawlikowskiThe Grand Budapest Hotel by Wes AndersonThe Great Beauty by Paolo SorrentinoThe Imitation Game by Morten TyldumThe Wolf of Wall Street by Martin Scorsese

Best Director
 Richard Linklater – BoyhoodBest Actor
 Michael Keaton – BirdmanBest Actress
 Cate Blanchett – Blue JasmineBest Supporting Actor
 J. K. Simmons – WhiplashBest Supporting Actress
 Patricia Arquette – Boyhood 
Best Ensemble Cast
 The Grand Budapest HotelBest Original Screenplay
 Spike Jonze – Her 
Best Adapted Screenplay
 John Ridley – 12 Years a SlaveBest Cinematography
 Emmanuel Lubezki – GravityBest Production Design
 Adam Stockhausen and Anna Pinnock – The Grand Budapest Hotel 
Best Editing
 Alfonso Cuarón and Mark Sanger – GravityBest Original Score
 Alexandre Desplat – The Grand Budapest Hotel 
Best Visual Effects
 Tim Webber, Chris Lawrence, David Shirk, and Neil Corbould – Gravity''

References

External links
 IOFCP Home

International film awards
Awards established in 2007
Film critics associations